The Act of the Heart is a 1970 Canadian drama film written, directed and produced by Paul Almond. It stars Geneviève Bujold, Donald Sutherland, Monique Leyrac, and Sharon Acker.

Plot 

Martha Hayes (Geneviève Bujold) is a devoutly religious young woman from Québec's Côte-Nord who fancies herself as some kind of a saint. She has come to Montreal to serve as a nanny to Russell (Bill Mitchell), the son of a widowed business woman (Monique Leyrac).

Martha joins a church choir and becomes attracted to Father Michael Ferrier (Donald Sutherland), an Augustinian monk who has selected her to sing solo in an interfaith concert. Russell accidentally dies.  Martha suffers a crisis in faith and to Ferrier declares her love for him. Ferrier reciprocates and leaves the order so they can live together with Martha singing to support them. She is tormented by guilt for betraying her profound religious principles she immolates herself on a hill (Mount Royal) overlooking Montreal.

Comment

The second of three films by Almond featuring Bujold, it aroused considerable difference in opinion upon its release, but it stands nonetheless as a profound statement on the universal themes of ritual, sacrifice and purification. A disappointment at the box-office, it nevertheless won six Canadian Film Awards - including Direction (Almond) and Lead Actress (Bujold). ‘Act of the Heart is the first Canadian feature film that compares in artistic quality and importance with the best of our literature, painting and music.’ – John Hofsess, Maclean’s.

References

External links

Canadian drama films
1970 films
English-language Canadian films
Films set in Montreal
Films directed by Paul Almond
Universal Pictures films
1970s English-language films
Quebec films
1970 drama films
1970s Canadian films